Petrocodon pseudocoriaceifolius is a species of plant first found in limestone karsts of Guangxi, China. It is similar to Petrocodon coriaceifolius, differing in the texture, size and shape of its leaves; the size and pubescence of its inflorescence and corolla; the shape of its anther; and length of its pistil.

References

pseudocoriaceifolius
Plants described in 2014